The heavy metal band Manigance was formed in France in 1995, with François Merle, Daniel Pouylau, and Didier Delsaux. Their first production was a six-track mini-album called Signe de vie, released by Brennus Music in 1997. This was followed by a studio album titled Ange ou démon, released by NTS in 2002. Manigance was awarded the honorary title of "Best French group 2003" by Hard Rock Magazine. The band continued to release new albums in 2004, 2006, 2011, 2014 and 2018. In March 2018 the band went on an extended European tour with the band Myrath. The current (2020) members of the band are Carine Pinto, François Merle, Lionel Vizerie, Stéphane Lacoude, and Patrick Soria.

BIOGRAPHY

The beginnings (1995–2002) 
The band was formed in 1995 by guitarist François Merle (ex-Killers) and drummer Daniel Pouylau, joined by Didier Delsaux on vocals. Manigance is launched as a cover band that includes groups like Van Halen, Pretty Maids, Toto and Judas Priest. The musicians compose a few songs to make it their first demo (recorded with the means at hand in the basement of a friend's pavilion). They then contacted Alain Ricard, director of Brennus Music, and offered to release a six-track mini-album. In 1997, Signe de vie was released in a limited edition of 500 copies.

Ange ou démon (2003–2004) 
Encouraged by the good echoes, the group embarked on the writing of a first studio album. Not knowing a producer, they set about building their own studio. François Merle decides to learn the main rudiments of production by immersing himself in specialized magazines. The new compositions of the group seduce Olivier Garnier who directs NTS. The label signs the band (first French group in its catalog). Their first studio album, Ange ou démon, was released on April 16, 2002. The specialist press was full of praise, and the album obtained very good marks, notably from the German magazine Rock Hard. There followed dates on the roads of France in April and May 2002 with Royal Hunt, U.D.O. and Freedom Call. Success in France was hoped for, but it is in Japan that sales are even better (5,000 copies). Despite this, the NTS label will not want to invest in a too expensive tour.

In 2003, NTS chose to remaster the mini-album Signe de vie by completing it with two covers of the Canadian group Triumph All the King's Horses and Carry On a Flame, as well as the only English-speaking track composed for the occasion Believer, and of a video recorded live on April 28, 2002 on which Manigance takes over Messager of Sortilège in the company of Christian "Zouille" Augustin, former singer of the band. The album is dedicated to Vincent Mouyen, ex-guitarist of the group who died in 2001. Manigance won the honorary title of "Best French group 2003" at the Hard Rock Magazine trophies. During the trophy ceremony at La Locomotive (Paris), the group has the great pleasure to take on Future World on stage with the musicians of Pretty Maids. The video will appear as a bonus to the studio album then being written.

D'un autre sang (2004-2005) 
After a fairly progressive metal Ange ou démon influenced by bands like Dream Theater or Vanden Plas, the style of his successor D'un autre sang is more heavier, and the sound less "licked". The band no longer has all its time to compose and record because the label gives a timing to respect. Everyone puts their own to it and the result is there, even if we can regret a more aggressive song even though still melodic. Bruno Ramos takes care of most of the guitar solos because François Merle is very busy with the production. Note a solo signed Cédric Dupont (Freedom Call) on Maudit. The cover as for it, is entrusted to Jean-Pascal Fournier, having already worked for Edguy or Nightmare for example. When it was released in early 2004, D'un autre sang was very well received. The group therefore goes on tour on the roads of France with Adagio in February, but also with Stratovarius in May, and European dates (Belgium and Netherlands).

L'ombre et la lumière (2005–2009) 

Even if Manigance only has two studio albums to its credit, the group gave birth to a live performance in 2005. It was recorded at the Élysée Montmartre Hall (Paris) on February 17, 2004 with the exception of the title Dernier hommage captured the next day at La Laiterie Hall in Strasbourg. No title from Signe de vie is included on Mémoires ... live. The NTS label having filed for bankruptcy, Replica Records (still with Olivier Garnier) distributes the album. The group is working on its next opus but gets some stages as opener of Scorpions at the Olympia (Paris) on July 4, 2005, and its participation in the Raismesfest festival on September 10 of the same year.

Manigance's fourth studio album was released in France on May 15, 2006. L'ombre et la lumière gives pride of place to the instrumental parts. The eponymous title is 7 min 36 s. The song structures are more complex with breaks, rhythm changes and more solos. An instrumental made its appearance for the first time in the discography of Manigance.

While he has written all the texts of the group since its formation in 1995, Didier Delsaux offers Laurent Piquepaille (fan of the first hour or so) the opportunity to write together La Force des souvenirs, the ballad of the album. The cover is the work of Mattias Noren, already known for his work with Evergrey and Iced Earth among others. Once again, the press welcomes the new opus of the group. Specialized sites also praise L'ombre et la lumière. After opening for Whitesnake in Toulouse for the music festival in June 2006, the group went on tour in November with DragonForce and Firewind.

In June 2007, Manigance played headlining on Reunion Island for the music festival, but also at Hellfest in Clisson on the Gibson Stage. The years 2008 and 2009 are devoted to the composition of a new album and to the search for a new label. XIII Bis Records signs the band, and in 2009 released a box set including the four studio albums and the live album.

Récidive et Volte face (2011-2018) 
Manigance's fifth studio album, Récidive, was released on January 31, 2011 in France (January 16 in Japan).

In September 2012, Daniel Pouylau announced that he was leaving the group. He is replaced by Guillaume Rodriguez.

Marc Duffau in turn left the group in June 2013, and gave his last concert in Saint-Rémy-de-Provence on August 24. He is replaced by Stéphane Lacoude (Blind Panther, Manigance (1995/1996), Hardsenic ...).

The band released a new album at the end of 2014, Volte-face, on Verycords Records. The album was announced on August 24 in Japan on the Marquee Avalon label.

In May 2016, a new drummer joined the group, Patrick Soria (ex-Killers).

Machine Nation (since 2018) 
Machine Nation's new album will be released on February 2, 2018 in France (Verycords) and the rest of the world (Mighty music), except in Japan (Spiritual beast) on February 14, 2018.

The titles are melodic and powerful, in the Manigance style, always sung in French. The particularity of this album is a duet between singer Didier Delsaux and Carine Pinto on the first track "Face Contre Terre".

Didier Delsaux left the group on February 3 and Carine Pinto became the official singer of Manigance. The group goes on a European tour in support of Myrath (18 shows all around Europe):27/01/18 Pau (FR) - Ampli

08/03/18 Paris (FR) - Le Trabendo

09/03/18 Rotterdam (NL) - Baroeg

10/03/18 Arnhem (NL) - Willemen

12/03/18 Berlin (DE) - Quasimodo

13/03/18 Hamburg (DE) - Headcrash

14/03/18 Köln (DE) - Underground

15/03/18 Frankfurt (DE) - Nachtleben

16/03/18 Stuttgard (DE) - Clubcann

17/03/18 Munich (DE) - Backstage

19/03/18 Ostrava (CZ) - Garage Club

20/03/18 Bratislava (SK) - Randal Club

22/03/18 Milan (IT) - Legend Club

23/03/18 Geneva (CH) - Undertown

24/03/18 Montauban (FR) - Rio Grande

25/03/18 Narbonne (FR) - LE DB

27/03/18 Madrid (SP) - Caracol

28/03/18 Barcelona (SP) - Sala Boveda

30/03/18 Nantes (FR) - Le Ferrailleur On February 4, 2020, while the group is working on their next album, the first opus with Carine Pinto on vocals ; Bruno Ramos, busy on other projects, announces his departure from Manigance.

This album is played on stage :

 Manigance + Side Winder + Lust (Bordeaux - France) - 10/01/2019
 Manigance + Kingcrown + Kryzees (Chez Paulette - Nancy - France) - 22/03/2019
 Fortunato + Manigance + Kingcrown + Max Pie - Fortunato And Friends (Jack Jack - Lyon - France) - 23/03/2019
 Threshold + Eldritch + Manigance + Mobius - Ready For Prog Fest (Toulouse - France) - 11/10/2019
 TNT + Manigance - Tous unis autour de Diego (Hasparren - France) - 12/10/2019
 Manigance + Wedingoth + Kingcrown - Festival Au Son Du Metal (Seyssuel - France) - 19/10/2019
 Sortilège + Satan + Freedom Call + Titan + Manigance + Existence + Tentation - Festival de Vouziers (France) - 26/10/2019

It is Lionel Vizerie, who has already played with Patrick Soria, and acts as Bruno on 2 dates in 2019, who is announced as an artilleryman on February 23, 2020.

MEMBERS

Current members 

 Carine Pinto - vocals (since 2018)
 François Merle - guitar (since 1995)
 Lionel Vizerie - guitar (since 23/02/2020)
 Stéphane Lacoude - bass (1995-1996, since 2013)
 Patrick Soria - drums (since 2016)

Ex-members 

 Bruno Ramos - guitar (depuis 1998–2020)
 Didier Delsaux - vocals (1995-2018)
 Jean Lahargue - keyboards
 Guillaume Rodriguez - drums (2012-2016)
 Florent Taillandier - keyboards
 Marc Duffau - bass (?-2013)
 Daniel Pouylau - drums (1995-2012)
 Vincent Mouyen - guitar (dead in 2001)

Discography

Studio albums

1997 : Signe de vie 

 Sans fard
 Signe de vie
 Ligne blanche
 Rebelle
 Aube nouvelle
 Rouge comme la peau

2002 : Ange ou démon 

 En mon nom
 Comme une ombre
 L'ultime seconde
 Utopia
 Ange ou démon
 Fleurs du mal
 Dernier hommage
 Dès mon retour
 Intégrité
 Nomade
 Désobéis
 Messager

2003 : Signe de vie (remaster) 

 Sans fard
 Signe de vie
 Ligne blanche
 Rebelle
 Aube nouvelle
 Rouge comme la peau
 L'ultime seconde (acoustic version)
 All king's horses
 Carry on the flame
 Believer

2004 : D'un autre sang 

 Mirage
 Empire virtuel
 Mourir en héros
 Héritier
 Hors la loi
 Maudit
 Mémoire
 Damoclès
 La mort dans l'âme
 D'un autre sang 
 Enfin délivré

2006 : L'ombre et la lumière 

 Abysse
 Envahisseur
 L'ombre et la lumière
 Prison dorée
 Prédateur
 Sang millénaire
 Privilège
 La force des souvenirs
 Sentinelle
 Miroir de la vie
 Esclave
 Labyrinthe

2011 : Récidive 

 Aura (intro)
 Larme de l'univers
 Dernier allié
 Mercenaire
 L'ombre d'hier
 Chant de bataille
 Secret de l'âme
 Récidiviste
 Illusion
 Sentiers de la peur
 Vertiges
 En seigneur
 Déserteur
 Délivrance
 Sans détour

2014 : Volte face 

 Pur sang
 Leader
 Le coté sombre
 Apparence
 Volte face
 Ultimatum
 Sans relâche
 Planeta Zemlya
 Say it ain't so (Murray Head cover)
 Le mirage
 Parjure

2018 : Machine nation 

 Adage (intro)
 Face contre terre
 Ennemi
 Machination
 Indifférent
 Loin d'ici
 La donne doit changer
 Avec des si
 Méandres
 L'un de l'autre
 Exutoire
 Nouvelle ère

Live album

2005 : MEMOIRES... live 

 Mirage (intro)
 Empire virtuel
 Mourir en héros
 Comme une ombre
 Mémoire
 Maudit
 D'un autre sang
 La mort dans l'âme
 L'ultime seconde
 Héritier
 Drums solo
 Dès mon retour
 En mon nom

Compilation 

 2009 : Original albums classics (4 studio album and live album)

References

External links
 Official website

Musical groups established in 1995
French power metal musical groups
1995 establishments in France